Bernard Gallagher (1929–2016) was a British actor.

Bernard Gallagher may also refer to:
Bernard J. Gallagher (1912–1995), American politician in state of Washington
Bernard David Gallagher (1925–2003), Canadian politician in Saskatchewan
Benny Gallagher (born 1945), Scottish musician

See also 
Bernard Gallacher (born 1949), Scottish former golfer
Bernie Gallacher (1967–2011), Scottish footballer